R330 road may refer to:
 R330 road (Ireland)
 R330 road (South Africa)